The Imo Formation, or Imo Shale, is a geologic unit in northern Arkansas that dates to the Chesterian Series of the late Mississippian. The Imo is considered to be a member of the upper Pitkin Formation, and is the most recent Mississippian age rock in Arkansas. The Imo Shale unconformably underlies the Pennsylvanian age Hale Formation

The stratigraphic placement of this interval has long been debated. It was introduced in 1964 as the "Imo Formation," representing an interval of shale that was presumably of Mississippian and possibly of Pennsylvanian age. However, in a footnote in the first publication to use this designation, the author noted that the shale interval had been mapped into the Pennsylvanian Cane Hill Member of the Hale Formation and revoked use of the name "Imo Formation".

The name was reintroduced in 1973 as the "Imo Shale", and in 2010 was classified as a member of the Mississippian age Pitkin Formation.

Paleontology

Cephalopods

 Anthracoceras
 A. discus
 Cravenoceras
 C. mapesi
 Delepinoceras
 D. bressoni
 Eumorphoceras
 E. imoense
 E. richardsoni
 Fayettevillea
 F. bransoni
 F. friscoense

 Metadimorphoceras
 M. saundersi
 Peytonoceras
 P. ornatum
 Rhadinites
 R. miseri
 Somoholites
 S. cadiconiformisj
 Stenoglaphyrites
 S. involutum
 Syngastrioceras
 S. imprimis

Flora
Stacheoides
S. tenuis

Foraminifera
Earlandia
Endothyra
Eosigmoilina
E. explicata
E. rugosa
Monotaxinoides
Neoarchaediscus
Priscella
Trepeilopsis
Zellerina
Z. discoidea

Ostracods
 Cavellina
 Cornigella
 Gortanella
 Healdia
 Healdioides
 Hollinella
 Monoceratina
 Sargentina
 Youngiella

See also

 List of fossiliferous stratigraphic units in Arkansas
 Paleontology in Arkansas

References

 

Carboniferous Arkansas
Carboniferous southern paleotropical deposits